This was the first edition of the tournament.

Jessie Aney and Anna Sisková won the title, defeating Jenny Dürst and Weronika Falkowska in the final, 6–3, 6–4.

Seeds

Draw

Draw

References

External links
Main Draw

Carinthian Ladies Lake's Trophy - Doubles